The Golden Awards (金视奖) was an award show presented by ntv7 to recognise excellence in the production and performance of Malaysian Chinese television before the channel's rebranding. The first awards show took place on 25 September 2010 at the Putrajaya International Convention Centre in Putrajaya and was hosted by Malaysian Cheryl Lee and Singaporean Bryan Wong.

There are 19 awards which will be presented at the first annual awards show. These awards are divided into three categories, namely Drama, non-Drama and Viewers' Choice.

The nominees for this awards show will be assessed by a judging panel consisting of experts within the Malaysian Chinese entertainment industry. All Malaysian Chinese television programmes qualify for nomination. Singapore-based Malaysian actors and actresses contracted to MediaCorp who have acted in co-productions are also eligible.

List of ceremonies

Awards

Drama category

Non-drama category

Variety

News & Current Affairs

Viewers’ choice category

See also

 List of Asian television awards
 2010 Golden Awards

References

External links
 2012 Golden Awards nominees
 

Awards established in 2010

Television awards
Television in Malaysia